The Men's 4 × 100 m Medley Relay event at the 2003 Pan American Games took place on August 17, 2003 (Day 16 of the Games).

Medalists

Records

Results

Notes

References
2003 Pan American Games Results: Day 16, CBC online; retrieved 2009-06-13.
swimmers-world 

Medley, Men's Relay 4x100m